Babylon is the second live DVD by William Control.  It was filmed at Bar Sinister in Hollywood on April 26, 2014  on a night off from Combichrist's We Love Tour, and released on August 14, 2014 through Control Records as a limited run of 500 DVDs and 100 USB flash drives.  Pre-orders began on June 27  through Control's Control Merch website.  The audio soundtrack is available as a download through iTunes and Amazon.  Tracks from the newly released The Neuromancer naturally featured heavily, and there were guest appearances from Andy Biersack of Black Veil Brides and Ash Costello of New Years Day.  Onstage performance art came from Isabella Garcia, Andrea Draven and Dorian Dane.

Track listing

Personnel
 William Control: vocals
 Kenneth Fletcher: bass
 Ian MacWilliams: keyboards
 Sound: Bob Bicknell
 Director: Tim Bullock
 Cinematography: Mike McMillin and Tim Bullock
 Film editing: A Glass Half
 Cover photos by: Anabel DFlux
 Live photos by: Lisa Johnson

References

2014 live albums
2014 video albums
William Control albums
Control Records albums
Live video albums
Live synth-pop albums